Parasenegalia is a small genus of flowering plants in the legume family, Fabaceae. It belongs to the subfamily Mimosoideae. It is found in tropical areas of the Caribbean, Central America, and South America.

Species list
The genus Parasenegalia comprises the following species:
 Parasenegalia amorimii (M.J.F.Barros & M.P.Lima) Seigler & Ebinger (2018)
 Parasenegalia grazielae (M.J.F.Barros & M.P.Lima) Seigler & Ebinger (2018)
 Parasenegalia incerta (Hoehne) Seigler & Ebinger (2018)
 Parasenegalia lundellii Seigler & Ebinger (2017)
 Parasenegalia miersii (Benth.) Seigler & Ebinger (2018)
 Parasenegalia muricata (L.) Seigler & Ebinger (2017)
 Parasenegalia rurrenabaqueana (Rusby) Seigler & Ebinger (2017)
 Parasenegalia santosii (G.P.Lewis) Seigler & Ebinger (2017)
 Parasenegalia skleroxyla (Tussac) Seigler & Ebinger (2017)
 Parasenegalia visco (Lorentz ex Griseb.) Seigler & Ebinger (2017)
 Parasenegalia vogeliana (Steud.) Seigler & Ebinger (2017)

See also
 Acacia
 Acaciella
 Mariosousa
 Pseudosenegalia
 Senegalia
 Vachellia

References

Mimosoids
Fabaceae genera